Tyrhaug Lighthouse (historical: Kyrhaug) is a coastal lighthouse located in Smøla Municipality, Møre og Romsdal county, Norway.  It sits in the Edøyfjorden on the islet of Ringholmen, east of the island of Edøya, off the southeast coast of the main island of Smøla.  The lighthouse is only accessible by boat.

History
The lighthouse was established in 1833 and automated in 1967. The light emits white, red or green light (depending on direction), occulting twice during each period.

See also

Lighthouses in Norway
List of lighthouses in Norway

References

External links
 Norsk Fyrhistorisk Forening 

Lighthouses completed in 1833
Lighthouses in Møre og Romsdal
Smøla